FUBAR 2 (also known as FUBAR: Balls to the Wall or FUBAR: Gods of Blunder) is a 2010 comedy film and the sequel to the 2002 cult film FUBAR. It was released on October 1, 2010, in Canada.  It made its world premiere by opening the Midnight Madness program at the 2010 Toronto International Film Festival.

Plot
In Calgary, Terry (David Lawrence) and Dean (Paul Spence) are tired of barely scraping by on menial jobs. Recently evicted from their rented house, they are out of options until their old buddy and "party leader", Troy (better known as Tron) (Andrew Sparacino) gets them high-paying jobs laying oil pipeline in Fort McMurray.

While Terry quickly becomes a welcome member of the pipeline crew, Dean cannot take the pace of work and decides to injure himself for the Workers’ compensation money with Tron's help, however he quickly finds that the money offered is much less than he had expected. Flush with money and confidence, Terry starts dating Trish (Terra Hazelton), a waitress at the local strip bar who has slept with every member of the pipeline crew at one time or another. When Terry quickly moves in with Trish, Dean does his best to save his friend from fading into a domestic lifestyle.

When layoffs hit the pipeline crew, Terry's fast-spending lifestyle quickly catches up with him, putting heavy strain on his relationship with Trish, who soon reveals she is pregnant. This only makes things worse, as it was revealed that Terry is infertile, meaning that the father is another member of the pipeline crew. Meanwhile, Dean's latest medical checkup for his Workers' compensation claim reveals that his cancer has returned in more aggressive form, due to his failure to attend a single follow-up treatment over the past five years. Terry, in a rage over an incident that occurred while Dean was drunk, ends their friendship, adding insult to injury. Dean reveals his condition only to Tron, who since being laid off has developed a serious crack habit. Each despondent for his own reason, Dean and Tron form a suicide pact, planning to end their lives the day after Christmas.

As Christmas fast approaches, Terry finds out from another member of the pipeline crew that Dean has lost his other testicle due to cancer. Terry rethinks his decision and goes to pick Dean up from a Hobo colony, where he has been living out of his car. Terry welcomes Dean into his home for Christmas. On Christmas Eve, Dean's family arrives, showing him there are things worth living for, and he decides to forego committing suicide, however, Tron shows up at Terry's house, intent on fulfilling the pact. Tron attempts to smother Dean with a pillow, but Dean fights back and ends up in a scuffle with Tron, in which Tron soils himself. Dean's daughter Chaz is awakened by the whole ordeal, and walks into the living room finding Tron dressed in a red suit and a Santa hat. Believing him to be Santa, she gives Tron a hug.

The film ends with Dean discovering that his complete lack of testicles has allowed him to sing higher notes than ever before, and he performs as the wedding singer for Terry and Trish. The two leave the reception and are showered by friends and family, including Tron, who also decided not to commit suicide. The film ends with a family photo of Terry, Dean, Trish and the new baby, who bears a striking resemblance to Dean.

Cast

Production
Filming began in November 2009.  Early plot ideas regarding Terry and Dean trying to conquer Hollywood were scrapped, in favour of the Fort McMurray storyline.  Once again the dialogue was heavily improvised, and the budget was "a lot more" than the first film, according to Dowse.

References

External links
 
 

2010 films
Canadian comedy films
English-language Canadian films
2010s English-language films
Films directed by Michael Dowse
Films set in Calgary
Films shot in Edmonton
Films shot in Calgary
2010 comedy films
Canadian sequel films
2010s Canadian films